Ryu Deok-hwan (born June 12, 1987) is a South Korean actor.

Career
Ryu Deok-hwan began his career as a child actor on stage at age 6. Among his early TV drama appearances was a role on the popular Lifetime in the Country which he played for 8 years.

While he had played minor roles in several films, it was Ryu's breakout lead performance in Like a Virgin that earned him critical praise and industry recognition. He gained 28 kg in three months to play the role of a transgender teenager who joins the ssireum team.

Other notable roles include a high schooler desperate for a pair of Nikes in No Comment, a North Korean soldier in Welcome to Dongmakgol, a boy meeting his estranged father in My Son, a serial killer in Our Town, a medical student in Private Eye, a top neurosurgeon and forensic examiner in Quiz of God, and King Gongmin in Faith. He has also acted in the stage plays Equus, and Jang Jin's Clumsy People.

In 2012 he directed the short film Waiting for Jang Joon-hwan for the Olleh Smartphone Film Festival.

Personal life
Ryu's mother is musical producer Jung Ok-young.

On August 26, 2020, Ryu announced in his fan cafe that he would be marrying his girlfriend of seven years, CEO and model Jeon Su-rin.

In April 2021, Ryu announced that he would be holding a wedding with his fiancée Jeon Su-rin. It was held in April 2021, after the wedding had been postponed from October 2020 due to COVID-19. It was a private event with only family members and close friends.

Filmography

Film

As actor

As director

Television

Variety shows

Music video

Theater

Discography

Awards and nominations

References

External links 
 
 
 
 
 

1987 births
Living people
South Korean male stage actors
South Korean male film actors
South Korean male television actors
South Korean male child actors
Chung-Ang University alumni
20th-century South Korean male actors
21st-century South Korean male actors